Mitchell Horner is an American politician. He is the member for the 3rd district of the Georgia House of Representatives.

Life and career 
Horner was homeschooled. He was a businessperson.

In 2022, Horner defeated his opponent Darrell Weldon Sr. in the Republican primary election for the 3rd district of the Georgia House of Representatives. No Democratic candidate or incumbent was nominated to challenge him in the general election. He assumes his office in 2023, at which time he will succeed Dewayne Hill.

References 

Living people
Year of birth missing (living people)
Place of birth missing (living people)
Republican Party members of the Georgia House of Representatives
21st-century American politicians